Eunice Noda Sato (June 8, 1921 – February 12, 2021) was an American politician. She served as mayor of Long Beach, California from 1980 to 1982. As such she was the first Asian-American female mayor of a major American city, as well as the first female mayor of Long Beach.

Life and career

Sato was the daughter of Japanese parents Bunsaku and Sawa Maeda Noda. She attended Modesto Junior College, the University of Northern Colorado, and Columbia University, and became a teacher. She taught in Michigan and overseas in Yokohama, Japan. In 1950, she married Thomas Takahashi Sato. She moved to Long Beach in 1956. She was elected to the Long Beach City Council in 1975 and served until 1986. In 1991 she was appointed to the U.S. National Advisory Council on Educational Research by George H. W. Bush. In September 2014, the former Hill Middle School, near the campus of California State University, Long Beach was named in her honor, as Sato Academy of Mathematics and Science. Sato died at her home in Long Beach on February 12, 2021, aged 99.

See also 
Asian American and Pacific Islands American conservatism in the United States

References

1921 births
2021 deaths
American educators of Japanese descent
American mayors of Japanese descent
American politicians of Japanese descent
American women of Japanese descent in politics
California politicians of Japanese descent
Columbia University alumni
Women city councillors in California
Asian-American city council members
Mayors of Long Beach, California
People from Merced County, California
Women mayors of places in California
University of Northern Colorado alumni
California Republicans
21st-century American women
Asian conservatism in the United States